The Joy of Singing,  Les 4 Saisons ("Le Printemps") is a 1972 album by the Swingle Singers on the Philips Records label.  All tracks from this album are also included on the 11 disk Philips boxed set, Swingle Singers.

Track listing
Tracks 1-3 from Vivaldi's Four Seasons
"Allegro" (Vivaldi) – 3:06
"Largo" (Vivaldi) – 2:43
"Allegro (Danse pastorale)" (Vivaldi) – 3:19
"Canon in D major," instrumental arrangement (Pachelbel) – 4:23
"Sinfonia," Cantata No. 209, "Non sa che sia dolore," BWV 209 (BC G50)	(Bach) – 3:32
"Adagio," Concerto for oboe, strings & continuo in D minor, SF. 935 (Marcello) – 3:06
"Le nozze di Figaro" ("The Marriage of Figaro"), opera, K. 492~Ouverture (Mozart) – 3:58
"Allegro," Concerto for 2 violins, strings & continuo in D minor ("Double"), BWV 1043 (Bach) – 3:50
"Fugue - Molto Allegro," String Quartet No. 14 in G major ("Spring"), K. 387 (Mozart) – 4:08

Personnel
Vocals:
Christiane Legrand – soprano
Nicole Darde – soprano
Hélène Devos – alto
Claudine Meunier – alto
Ward Swingle – tenor, arranger
Joseph Noves – tenor
Jean Cussac – bass
José Germain – bass
Rhythm section:
Jacky Cavallero – double bass
Roger Fugen – drums

References / external links

Philips PHS 700 004, Philips 763 924
The Joy of Singing at [ Allmusic.com]

The Swingle Singers albums
1972 albums